The Brickell Mausoleum is a historic mausoleum located in Miami, Florida at 501 Brickell Avenue. On January 4, 1989, it was added to the U.S. National Register of Historic Places.

References

External links

 

  at National Register of Historic Places
 
 
 

Buildings and structures in Miami
National Register of Historic Places in Miami